Carl Heinrich Schnauffer (4 July 1823 Heimsheim - 4 September 1854 Baltimore, Maryland) was a poet, soldier and editor.

He founded the Baltimore Wecker in the fall of 1851. Before this time, he was one of the editors of the Journal in the city of Mannheim in Baden, Germany. By taking part in the German revolution of 1848-49, he was compelled to leave his native country. After he died, his widow continued the Wecker without interruption.

References
 J. Thomas Scharf, The chronicles of Baltimore, 1874, p. 104.

Further reading
 J. Thomas Scharf, History of Baltimore City and County from the Earliest Period to the Present Day: Including Biographical Sketches of Their Representative Men. (Philadelphia: L. H. Everts). 1881.

1823 births
1854 deaths
People from Enzkreis
19th-century American poets
American male poets
German emigrants to the United States
German-American Forty-Eighters
Maryland socialists
19th-century American journalists
American male journalists
19th-century American male writers